The Democratic Organisation for Kayan National Unity (DOKNU) was a political party in Myanmar.

History
Following the reintroduction of multi-party democracy after the 8888 Uprising, the party contested three seats in the 1990 general elections. It received 0.12% of the vote, winning two seats; U Khun Marko Ban in Pekhon and U R.P. Thaung in Thandaung.

The party was banned by the military government in 1992. Party members later established the Kayan National Party.

References

Defunct political parties in Myanmar
1992 disestablishments in Myanmar
Political parties disestablished in 1992